The Huali Happy Messenger is a city car manufactured by the Chinese automaker Huali from 2003 to 2008 and from 2006 to 2013 for American market electric vehicles startup Miles Electric Vehicle.

Overview

The Huali Happy Messenger was manufactured by the Huali brand which was later renamed as FAW-Jiaxing. 

The Huali Happy Messenger was introduced in 2003 and shares the same platform as the second generation Daihatsu Move which is built upon the chassis of the Mira but with a taller body. 

The Happy Messenger by Huali was powered by a 1.0 4-cylinder engine producing 55hp and mated to a 5-speed manual gearbox. The Happy Messenger was exported to many foreign countries including Egypt and several Eastern European countries, and was marketed mostly under the name FAW Angel. An electric variant was also offered in the USA as the Miles ZX40.

References 

 
2000s cars
City cars
Hatchbacks
Front-wheel-drive vehicles
Cars of China